William Patrick Hogan (September 15, 1937 – January 12, 2022) was a Canadian politician in Newfoundland and Labrador. He represented  Placentia in the Newfoundland House of Assembly from 1989 to 1993. He served in cabinet as Minister of Municipal and Provincial Affairs. Hogan was mayor of Dunville from 1969 to 1989, and also served as mayor of Placentia from 1997 to 2001, and 2005 to 2014. He died on January 12, 2022, at the age of 84.

References

1937 births
2022 deaths
Liberal Party of Newfoundland and Labrador MHAs
Mayors of places in Newfoundland and Labrador
People from Placentia, Newfoundland and Labrador
Politicians from St. John's, Newfoundland and Labrador